The Simca-Gordini Type 15, also known simply as the Gordini Type 15, is an open-wheel race car, designed, developed, and built by French manufacturer Gordini, to compete in Formula One, and was produced between  and .

References

Open wheel racing cars
Formula One cars
1950s cars
Cars of France